Floyd Lee Wakefield (December 4, 1919 – April 5, 2007) served in the California State Assembly for the 52nd district from 1967 to 1974 and during World War II he served in the United States Army.

References

United States Army personnel of World War II
Members of the California State Legislature
1919 births
2007 deaths
20th-century American politicians